Conewago Chapel Covered Bridge, also known as the Blue Spring Covered Bridge, was a historic wooden covered bridge located in Conewago and Mount Pleasant Townships in Adams County, Pennsylvania. It crossed the South Branch of Conewago Creek and was one of 17 historic covered bridges in Adams, Cumberland, and Perry Counties when it was listed on the National Register of Historic Places (NRHP).

It was listed on the National Register of Historic Places (NRHP) in 1980, but was destroyed in an arson fire on June 14, 1985. The bridge was removed from the NRHP in 1986.

References

Bridges in Adams County, Pennsylvania
Covered bridges in Pennsylvania
Covered bridges in Adams County, Pennsylvania
Bridges completed in 1899
Wooden bridges in Pennsylvania
Covered bridges in the United States destroyed by arson
Arson in Pennsylvania
1899 establishments in Pennsylvania
Road bridges in Pennsylvania
Burr Truss bridges in the United States
Former National Register of Historic Places in Pennsylvania